Hautecour may refer to:
Hautecour, Jura, a commune in the French region of Franche-Comté
Hautecour, Savoie, a commune in the French region of Rhône-Alpes